Michael Boyer II, better known by his stage names Knowdaverbs and later Verbs, is a Christian hip hop artist. He has recorded for Gotee Records.

Background
He started rapping at the age of twelve, and spent time dancing with GRITS during the mid-'90s. At first he did not gain much acceptance for singing hip-hop in nearby churches which laughed at him exclaiming "hip-hop's a pit of hell".  His debut album, The Syllabus (1999), and his second album, The Action Figure (2000) were both fairly successful for gospel rap. His first album under the name "Verbs" (Unlocked) was slightly delayed when he spent six months in South Africa on a mission with his home church in Nashville, Tennessee. His latest album The Groundwork Theory, was released September 11, 2007.

His lyrics take a middle ground approach between the explicit doctrine of the Cross Movement and the poetic musings of the GRITS.

Discography

Studio albums

EPs

Collaborations on other albums
GRITS - Factors of the Seven - "U.S. Open", "Hopes and Dreams" and "Gospel Rap; Parables" along with Jurny Big of LPG. He also appeared in the Music Video - "Hopes and Dreams / What Be Goin' Down".
GRITS - Grammatical Revolution - "Strugglin'" and "C2K".
GRITS - The Art of Translation - "Video Girl".
GRITS - Quarantine - "Different Drum"
Out of Eden - More Than You Know - "Get It Right".
Out of Eden - No Turning Back - "Lookin for Love" and "No Turning Back" along with GRITS.
DJ Maj - Wax Museum: the Mixtape - "Equeena (Remix)" and "Set Sail" along with GRITS.
DJ Maj - Full Plates: Mixtape 2 - "Gung Ho" along with Mat Kearney.
DJ Maj - The Ringleader: Mixtape Volume III - "So Excited" along with Shonlock.
DJ Maj - BoogiRoot - "Rhyme Pocket Interlude".
DJ Maj - Sabbatical Transit
KJ-52 - 7th Avenue - "Keep It Movin'".
Camp Quest - Camp Quest - "Sunday Drive".
Verses - Listening Session - "Cassette Tapes & Roller Skates"
Pettidee - Thug Love - "Push" along with GRITS
Pillar - Above - "Galactic Groove"
Silage - Vegas Car Chasers - "Verb"
Proxy - Proximus
DJ darryL and DJ C3Po "Beat, Bass, Breaks and Other Things That Go Thump in the Night" - What Wouldn't Jesus Do?

Compilation contributions
Sonic Imperial: Sounds of the Prophets - "Call of the Dung Beetle".
Best of Rescue Records 1993-2003/Urban - "Call of the Dung Beetle".
Gotee Urban Vol. 2 - "God Is Big" and "Just the Facts".
Gotee Records presents: Showcase - "God Is Big".
Raggamuffin Hip Hop - "Giant Slayers" and "If I Were Mayor/Governor" with Stitchie
Beat, Bass, Breaks and Other Things That Go Thump in the Night DJ darryL and DJ c3po- What Wouldn't Jesus Do? "N*Soul" label

References

External links
Official Site (Archive.org Backup)
Verbs Artist Profile on Cross Rhythms.

American hip hop musicians
American performers of Christian hip hop music
Living people
Gotee Records artists
Year of birth missing (living people)